Association of China and Mongolia International Schools (otherwise known as ACAMIS) is a non-profit association of international schools in eastern Asia and comprises over fifty international schools from China, Hong Kong, Macau, Taiwan and Mongolia. The association acts as a networking platform with the aims to broaden the education dimensions of participating schools, advance the professional growth of school staff members, promote international friendship within the schools through activities, encourage student interaction through extra curricular activities in sports, the arts, and environmental issues, and finally collaborate on the professional development of participating members.

Members of ACAMIS are all international schools within the region, having commitment to an international program delivered in English. A few of the acceptable curricula are major international, American, Canadian, Australian, or British programs, including, International Baccalaureate, CIS, WASC, NEASC, Middle States Association Accreditation, Ontario, New Brunswick and Alberta education systems, New South Wales Board of Studies, and OFSTED.

ACAMIS holds an annual conference that hosts workshops in regards in learning and the dynamics of interaction with the Chinese culture. This year's conference is hosted at the Suzhou Singapore International School in July.

In addition to education and staff development, ACAMIS is also a major sports league in the region, hosting sports tournaments between schools, usually happening after ISAC (International Schools Association of China), and before APAC (Asia-Pacific Activities Conference) events.



Sports

The activity and sporting wing of the association is called the Association of China and Mongolia International Schools Sports League (or ACAMIS Sports League), and is one of the largest activities and athletics association in the region. All participating members of ACAMIS are automatically members of the sports league. The ACAMIS Sports League is designed to better meet the aims of ACAMIS through athletic activities by allowing students to experience and participate in cooperative and competitive sport, providing a safe environment, and allowing for students the opportunity to travel and meet new friends.

The three major sporting seasons are volleyball, basketball, and soccer. Other sports include badminton, swimming, table tennis, netball, golf, rugby, and track and field.

Sports are divided into gender groups, and different divisions, with six participating schools per division. Major sports rules are applied in ACAMIS tournaments, however, there are minor changes to sure their goal to provide a safe environment for the students to play in. Tournaments are played in round robin, followed by elimination games for the outstanding teams.

They are known for producing world-class high school athletes such as Nadeem Moallem of TEDA International School.

Member schools 
Mainland China
Access International Academy Ningbo
American International School of Guangzhou
Beijing BISS International School
Beijing City International School
Beijing International Bilingual Academy
British School of Beijing
Canadian International School of Beijing
Chinese International School
Concordia International School Shanghai
Dalian American International School
Dulwich College Beijing
Dulwich College Shanghai
Dulwich College Suzhou
International Academy of Beijing
International School of Beijing
International School of Nanshan Shenzhen
International School of Qingdao
International School of Tianjin
Livingston American School
Nanjing International School
Qingdao No.1 International School of Shandong Province
QSI International School of Shekou
SCIS - Hangzhou International School
SCIS - Hongqiao Campus
SCIS - Pudong Campus
Shanghai American School Pudong Campus
Shanghai American School Puxi Campus
Shekou International School
Shenyang Transformation International School
Suzhou Singapore International School
TEDA International School
The British International School Shanghai - Puxi
The British International School Shanghai - Pudong
The New International School
Tianjin MTI International School
Utahloy International School Guangzhou
Utahloy International School Zengcheng
Western Academy of Beijing
Wuxi Taihu International School
Xiamen International School
Yew Chung International School of Beijing
Yew Chung International School of Shanghai
Hong Kong
Australian International School Hong Kong
Canadian International School of Hong Kong Limited
Christian Alliance PC Lau Memorial International School
Discovery College
Hong Kong Academy
Hong Kong International School
International College Hong Kong
Hong Lok Yuen International School of the New Territories
Renaissance College Hong Kong
Yew Chung International School of Hong Kong
Victoria Shanghai Academy
Macau
The International School of Macao
Taiwan
Kaohsiung American School
Ivy Collegiate Academy
I-Shou International School
Mongolia
American School of Ulaanbaatar
International School of Ulaanbaatar

References

External links
Official site



 
International school associations